Uzbekbaatar is a genus of extinct mammal from the Upper Cretaceous of Uzbekistan. It was a member of the extinct order Multituberculata within the suborder Cimolodonta, though its further affinities are unclear. The genus was named by Kielan-Jaworowska Z. and Nesov L.A. in 1992 and means "Uzbek hero".

The one species named by Kielan-Jaworowska and Nesov is Uzbekbaatar kizylkumensis, found in the Upper Cretaceous strata of Uzbekistan. A second species was also apparently described by Averianov in 1999.

References

Further reading 
 Kielan-Jaworowska and Nesov (1992), "Multituberculate mammals from the Cretaceous of Uzbekistan", Acta Palaeontologica Polonica 37, p. 1-17.
 Kielan-Jaworowska, Z. & Hurum, J.H. (2001), "Phylogeny and Systematics of multituberculate mammals", Paleontology 44, p. 389-429.
 Much of this information has been derived from : Mesozoic Mammals: "basal" Cimolodonta, Cimolomyidae, Boffiidae and Kogaionidae, an Internet directory.

Cimolodonts
Turonian life
Late Cretaceous mammals of Asia
Fossils of Uzbekistan
Bissekty Formation
Fossil taxa described in 1992
Taxa named by Zofia Kielan-Jaworowska
Prehistoric mammal genera